Comitas sobrina is an extinct species of sea snail, a marine gastropod mollusc in the family Pseudomelatomidae.

Description

Distribution
Fossils of this species were found in Cenozoic strata in Japan.

References

 YOKOYAMA, Matajiro. "Tertiary mollusca from Dainichi in Totomi." The Journal of the College of Science, Imperial University of Tokyo, Japan 45 (1923): 1-18.

sobrina
Gastropods described in 1923